Cincinnati Gymnastics Academy, commonly shortened to CGA, is an American women's artistic gymnastics academy in Fairfield, Ohio. It is one of the elite gymnastics facilities in the country and has trained various Olympians and world champions, including Amanda Borden and Jaycie Phelps

The academy was opened in the 1980s by current president and head coach Mary Lee Tracy.

Notable Gymnasts & Alumni 
Gymnasts who have trained at CGA include:

Alyssa Beckerman
 1999 World Championships team member
 2000 Summer Olympics alternate

Amanda Borden
 1996 Olympics Team champion
 Captain of the Magnificent Seven

Jaycie Phelps
 1996 Olympics Team champion
 Member of the Magnificent Seven

Kristy Powell
 1997 World Championships team member

Kim Zmeskal
 1992 Olympics Team bronze medalist
 1991 World All-Around Champion, Team silver medalist, Floor bronze medalist
 1992 World Balance Beam and Floor Exercise Champion

Ashley Priess
 2006 World Team silver medalist
 Alabama Crimson Tide

Samantha Sheehan
 2004 Olympic Trialist
 2002 World Floor Exercise bronze medalist
 Georgia Gymdogs

Kayla Williams
 2009 World vault champion
 Alabama Crimson Tide

Emily Gaskins
 National Team member (2013–16)
 2017 U.S. Classic Floor Exercise bronze medalist

Amelia Hundley
 National Team member (2011–17)
 2012 Pacific Rim Team Champion
 2015 Pan American Games Team Champion, Floor Exercise silver medalist, Uneven Bars bronze medalist
 2014 Pan American Team Champion
 2016 Stuttgart World Cup bronze medalist
 2016 Olympic Trials competitor
 Florida Gators (2017–20)

Amanda Jetter
 National Team member (2008–12)
 Alabama Crimson Tide (2014–17)

Lexie Priessman
 National Team member (2010–14)
 2012 Junior National Champion
 2012 Pacific Rim Team and Vault Champion, All-Around silver medalist
 Louisiana State Tigers (2016–19)

Lilly Lippeatt
 National Team member (2018–)
 2019 L'International Gymnix Team Champion, Balance Beam bronze medalist
 2020 L'International Gymnix Team Champion

References 

 
Sports teams in Cincinnati
Gymnastics clubs in the United States
Gymnastics in Ohio
1980s establishments in Ohio